The 1985 Kangaroo Tour of New Zealand was a mid-season tour of New Zealand by the Australia national rugby league team. The Australians played six matches on tour, including the final two games of a three-game test series against the New Zealand with the first test taking place in Brisbane on 18 June. The NZ tour began on 19 June and finished on 10 July.

Leadership
After long time coach Frank Stanton stepped down from representative coaching duties after Australia's successful defense of The Ashes in 1984 against the touring Great Britain Lions, the Australian Rugby League appointed former World Cup and Parramatta Eels coach Terry Fearnley as head coach of the Kangaroos. The team was captained by Wally Lewis who had also captained the team in 1984.

Controversy
While he was named Australian coach, Terry Fearnley had also been appointed as New South Wales State of Origin coach in 1985. The Blues won their first ever Origin series in 1985 after winning games 1 and two. In what was to prove a case of bad planning, the test series and the tour of New Zealand were scheduled to take place between games 2 and 3 of the Origin series.

Rumours soon surfaced that Fearnley and Lewis did not get along on tour. Lewis later confirmed this by admitting in television interviews that the pair hated each other while Fearnley openly admitted that in light of the circumstances he could have done a better job in bringing the team together. Lewis also publicly stated that he believed Fearnley openly favoured the teams vice-captain, NSW's Wayne Pearce as well as the rest of the Kangaroos who were in his NSW team. At one point before the third test in Auckland, Lewis claimed to have caught Fearnley and Pearce going over team selection in Fearnely's hotel room, something strongly denied by the pair.

Fearnley himself created controversy on the tour. In the book King Wally which was published in 1987, Wally Lewis claimed that Fearnley had said of team member Michael O'Connor (a NSW player) "Can't play, no heart. Lucky he can kick goals or he wouldn't be here". The publishing of this story led to some animosity over the coming years between Lewis and O'Connor despite them being regular test team mates until the end of 1989. But the biggest controversy came from the team selection for the third test. Fearnley dropped four players from the second test win, all Queenslanders (Chris Close, Mark Murray, Greg Dowling and Greg Conescu - Close and Dowling dropped to the bench), which caused all hell to break loose and prompted Queensland Rugby League Chairman, Senator Ron McAuliffe, to publicly condemn the dropping of the four Queensland players from a winning Test side, saying "Its a football assassination and beyond all reasoning. And there can be no reasonable excuse for it".

With the replacement players in place (Steve Ella, Des Hasler, Peter Tunks and Benny Elias), the disjointed Kangaroos would go on to lose the third test 18–0, the first time they had been held scoreless since losing 19–0 to Great Britain in 1956. Such was the animosity in the group between the NSW and Qld players that according to second row forward Paul Vautin (a Queenslander), dropped players Mark Murray and Greg Conescu acted as the Australian teams statisticians for the game. In his book Fatty: The Strife and Times of Paul Vautin, he told that both recorded a number of errors that were actually made by team mates to the players who replaced them in the side, Hasler and Elias.

Terry Fearnley stepped down as Australian coach following the tour. He would be replaced in 1986 by 1956–57 Kangaroo tourist and Canberra Raiders head coach Don Furner.

As a result of the problems during the tour, the Australian Rugby League made a number of decisions for future Australian teams, including:
 No current State of Origin coach can also be the current Australian coach.
 Mid-season test series will take place after the Origin series and not during one to avoid bringing the NSW vs Qld rivalry into the Australian team.

Touring squad

|- bgcolor="#CCCCFF"
| Player
| Club
| Position(s)
| Games
| Tries
| Goals
| F/Goals
| Points
|-
|- bgcolor="#FFFFFF"
| Noel Cleal
|  Manly Warringah Sea Eagles
| 
| 
| 
| 
| 
| 
|-
|- bgcolor="#FFFFFF"
| Chris Close
|  Manly Warringah Sea Eagles
| 
| 
| 
| 
| 
| 
|-
|- bgcolor="#FFFFFF"
| Greg Conescu
|  Brothers (Gladstone)
| 
| 
| 
| 
| 
| 
|-
|- bgcolor="#FFFFFF"
| Greg Dowling
|  Wynnum Manly Seagulls
| 
| 
| 
| 
| 
| 
|-
|- bgcolor="#FFFFFF"
| Benny Elias
|  Balmain Tigers
| 
| 
| 
| 
| 
| 
|-
|- bgcolor="#FFFFFF"
| Steve Ella
|  Parramatta Eels
| 
| 
| 
| 
| 
| 
|-
|- bgcolor="#FFFFFF"
| John Ferguson
|  Eastern Suburbs Roosters
| 
| 
| 
| 
| 
| 
|-
|- bgcolor="#FFFFFF"
| Des Hasler
|  Manly-Warringah Sea Eagles
| 
| 
| 
| 
| 
| 
|-
|- bgcolor="#FFFFFF"
| Garry Jack
|  Balmain Tigers
| 
| 
| 
| 
| 
| 
|-
|- bgcolor="#FFFFFF"
| Wally Lewis (c)
|  Wynnum Manly Seagulls
| 
| 
| 
| 
| 
| 
|-
|- bgcolor="#FFFFFF"
| Mal Meninga
|  Souths Magpies
| 
| 
| 
| 
| 
| 
|-
|- bgcolor="#FFFFFF"
| Mark Murray
|  Redcliffe Dolphins
| 
| 
| 
| 
| 
| 
|-
|- bgcolor="#FFFFFF"
| Michael O'Connor
|  St George Dragons
| 
| 
| 
| 
| 
| 
|-
|- bgcolor="#FFFFFF"
| Wayne Pearce (vc)
|  Balmain Tigers
| 
| 
| 
| 
| 
| 
|-
|- bgcolor="#FFFFFF"
| John Ribot
|  Redcliffe Dolphins
| 
| 
| 
| 
| 
| 
|-
|- bgcolor="#FFFFFF"
| Steve Roach
|  Balmain Tigers
| 
| 
| 
| 
| 
| 
|-
|- bgcolor="#FFFFFF"
| Peter Tunks
|  Canterbury-Bankstown Bulldogs
| 
| 
| 
| 
| 
| 
|-
|- bgcolor="#FFFFFF"
| Paul Vautin
|  Manly-Warringah Sea Eagles
| 
| 
| 
| 
| 
| 
|-
|- bgcolor="#FFFFFF"
| Peter Wynn
|  Parramatta Eels
| 
| 
| 
| 
| 
| 
|-

First test
Immediately prior to the tour, the first test took place at Lang Park in Brisbane on 18 June. This match is most remembered for the sideline fight between rival prop forwards Greg Dowling and Kevin Tamati after the pair had been sent to the sin-bin for fighting.

Tour
The Australian's played six games on the tour, winning five.

Second test
The Australian's escaped with a 10-6 win over New Zealand thanks to a last minute try to winger John Ribot.

Third test
The dead rubber third test also doubled as the first game of the 1985–1988 Rugby League World Cup tournament. John Ribot, Steve Ella, John Ferguson, Peter Wynn and Chris Close played their last tests for Australia.

References

External links

Rugby league tours of New Zealand
Australia national rugby league team tours
Kangaroo tour of New Zealand
Kangaroo tour of New Zealand